Precedence is the order in which the various corps of the British Army parade, from right to left, with the unit at the extreme right being highest.

Precedence

The British Army has frequently been the subject of amalgamation and re-organisation throughout its history. The general rule for establishing the order of precedence is the date of creation of the regiment and its subsequent unbroken service. Disbanded regiments automatically lost precedence. Since 1994 two orders of precedence used parochially and unofficially within the Yeomanry; the Army List of 1914 and the Order of Yeomanry Titles on parade at The Royal Yeomanry Review.  Irrespective of this, official precedence within the Army is set out in Queen's Regulations.

Order of precedence from the Army List of 1914
The first is a list of yeomanry units on the establishment at the outbreak of the First World War and therefore contains units that had been disbanded by the time of The Royal Yeomanry Review. This first list does not contain the North Irish, South Irish or King Edward's Horse who were on the Special Reserve at this time. The First Aid Nursing Yeomanry do not appear as they are not part of the British Army or its reserve.

Royal Wiltshire Yeomanry
Warwickshire Yeomanry
Yorkshire Hussars
Nottinghamshire (Sherwood Rangers)
Staffordshire Yeomanry
Shropshire Yeomanry
Ayrshire (Earl of Carrick's Own) Yeomanry
Cheshire Yeomanry
Queen's Own Yorkshire Dragoons
Leicestershire Yeomanry
North Somerset Yeomanry
Duke of Lancaster's Own Yeomanry
Lanarkshire Yeomanry
Northumberland Hussars
South Nottinghamshire Hussars
Denbighshire Hussars
Westmorland and Cumberland Yeomanry
Pembroke Yeomanry
Royal East Kent Yeomanry
Hampshire Yeomanry
Royal Buckinghamshire Yeomanry
Derbyshire Yeomanry
Queen's Own Dorset Yeomanry
Royal Gloucestershire Hussars
Hertfordshire Yeomanry
Berkshire Yeomanry
1st County of London (Middlesex Hussars)
Royal 1st Devon Yeomanry
Suffolk Yeomanry (Duke of York's Own Loyal Suffolk Hussars)
Royal North Devon Yeomanry
Queen's Own Worcestershire Hussars
Queen's Own West Kent Yeomanry
West Somerset Yeomanry
Queen's Own Oxfordshire Hussars
Montgomeryshire Yeomanry
Lothians and Border Horse
Queen's Own Royal Glasgow Yeomanry
Lancashire Hussars
Surrey Yeomanry
Fife and Forfar Yeomanry
Norfolk Yeomanry
Sussex Yeomanry
Glamorgan Yeomanry
Welsh Horse
Lincolnshire Yeomanry
City of London (Rough Riders)
2nd County of London (Westminster Dragoons)
3rd County of London Yeomanry (Sharpshooters)
Bedfordshire Yeomanry
Essex Yeomanry
Northamptonshire Yeomanry
East Riding of Yorkshire Yeomanry
1st Lovat's Scouts (sic)
2nd Lovat's Scouts (sic)
Scottish Horse

Order of Yeomanry titles on parade
The second order of precedence represents units that were on the establishment of the Territorial Army at the time of the review. Order of precedence in this instance includes the current role of the unit, placing Armoured Corps before Artillery and so on. Since the review, several units and sub-units have changed role and corps or been disbanded.

The approach taken at The Royal Yeomanry Review can be summarised as follows:
Units are ordered in accordance with British Army Order of Precedence
Sub-Units are ordered in accordance with the Army List of 1914, as amended by any subsequent disbandments, amalgamations etc.

The following is taken from the last page of the programme printed for The Royal Yeomanry Review. As on that day, the list below has been divided into blocks corresponding to the order in which the units formed and grouped.

 The Royal Yeomanry
 Royal Wiltshire Yeomanry
 Leicestershire and Derbyshire Yeomanry (PAO)
 Kent and Sharpshooters Yeomanry
 Inns of Court & City Yeomanry
 Westminster Dragoons

 The Royal Wessex Yeomanry
 Queen's Own Dorset Yeomanry
 Royal Wiltshire Yeomanry
 Royal Gloucestershire Hussars
 Royal Devon Yeomanry

 The Royal Mercian and Lancastrian Yeomanry
 Queen's Own Warwickshire and Worcestershire Yeomanry
 Queen's Own Staffordshire Yeomanry
 Shropshire Yeomanry
 Duke of Lancaster's Own Yeomanry

 The Queen's Own Yeomanry
 Queen's Own Yorkshire Yeomanry
 Sherwood Rangers Yeomanry
 Cheshire Yeomanry
 Northumberland Hussars

 The Scottish Yeomanry
 Earl of Carrick's Own Ayrshire Yeomanry
 Queen's Own Royal Glasgow Yeomanry
 Lothians and Border Horse
 Fife and Forfar Yeomanry/Scottish Horse

 North Irish Horse
 Bedfordshire Yeomanry
 Hertfordshire Yeomanry
 Suffolk Yeomanry (Duke of York's Own Loyal Suffolk Hussars)
 King's Own Royal Norfolk Yeomanry
 Glamorgan Yeomanry
 Sussex Yeomanry
 Hampshire Yeomanry
 Duke of Cambridge's Own Middlesex Yeomanry
 Cheshire Yeomanry
 Shropshire Yeomanry
 Queen's Own Warwickshire and Worcestershire Yeomanry
 Essex Yeomanry
 Queen's Own Oxfordshire Hussars
 Inns of Court & City Yeomanry
 Berkshire Yeomanry
 Kent and County of London Yeomanry
 Surrey Yeomanry
 Lovat Scouts
 Pembrokeshire (Castlemartin) Yeomanry
 First Aid Nursing Yeomanry (not an army unit)

See also

British Army Order of Precedence
Yeomanry
Second line yeomanry regiments of the British Army

Notes

 Units on the Special Reserve take precedence after a Regular Unit and before a Yeomanry Unit.
 The Welsh Horse was only raised after the outbreak of war in 1914. It was accorded precedence after its parent, the Glamorgan Yeomanry.
 The Scottish Horse was two regiments strong in peacetime, with a third regiment formed in August 1914.
 A Sqn Royal Yeomanry
 Band of the Royal Yeomanry
 B Sqn Royal Wessex Yeomanry
 A and HQ Sqns Royal Wessex Yeomanry

 A Sqn Royal Mercian and Lancastrian Yeomanry
 HQ Sqn Royal Mercian and Lancastrian Yeomanry
 C Sqn Queen's Own Yeomanry
 80 Sig Sqn (V), 33 Sig Regt (V)
 95 Sig Sqn (V), 35 Sig Regt (V)
 67 Sig Sqn (V), 37 Sig Regt (V)
 68 Sig Sqn (V), 71 Sig Regt (V)

References

Bibliography
 
 
 

Army Reserve (United Kingdom)
 Order of precedence, Yeomanry
Cavalry regiments of the British Army
United Kingdom 2